"Hier kommt Alex" (Here comes Alex) is a song by German punk band Die Toten Hosen. It is the first single and the first track from the album Ein kleines bisschen Horrorschau.  The song in concept introduces Alex, who is the central character on the concept album, a reference to Alex DeLarge, from the book A Clockwork Orange.

"Hier kommt Alex" is structurally and musically similar to the last track from the album, "Bye, Bye Alex".

Music video
The video was directed by Walter Knofel.

Inclusions in video games
The song appears as a bonus track in the game Guitar Hero III: Legends of Rock. It is also available as downloadable content for Guitar Hero World Tour.

It is included in the European release of the game Rock Band, and as a downloadable track on the American version. Due to licensing issues, the song was taken down from DLC services in 2013. The song was available for re-download in Rock Band 4 for those who purchased it prior to this date.

Cover versions
The song has been covered by many artists, among them Samsas Traum on Endstation.Eden, Gatos Sucios on Punto limite, Thomas Baldischwyler for the compilation Pudel Produkte 8, Sonnenbrandt, Scala & Kolacny Brothers on the album Grenzenlos. British punk band UK Subs covered it in English as "Here Comes Alex". In 2020, German medieval rock band Feuerschwanz covered the song with a medieval composition.

According to an interview, Die Ärzte had spontaneously played the song on a benefit concert to attract more crowd, because people were leaving after a bad band.

Track listing
 "Hier kommt Alex" (Meurer/Frege) – 3:53
 "Achterbahn" (Roller coaster) (Rohde/Frege) − 3:35
 "Zum Chef (Später Dank)" (To the boss (Later gratitude)) (von Holst/Frege) – 2:10
 "Jo singt (Das Wort zum Sonntag)" (Jo singt (The word to Sunday)) (von Holst/Frege) – 0:46
 "Liebeslied" (Love song) (Breitkopf/Frege) – 3:50

Charts

The Return of Alex

There's also an English version of the song, titled "The Return of Alex". This was released as a promo single for UK from the all-English album Love, Peace & Money.

Music video
The video was directed by René Eller and shows the band performing in a black-and-white TV-set.

Track listing
 "The Return of Alex" (Meurer/Frege, Dangerfield) − 4:29
 "So Long - Good Bye" − 3:13 (English version of "Schönen Gruß, auf Wiederseh'n")
 "I Fought the Law" (Sonny Curtis) − 2:35 (The Crickets cover)

In popular culture

Professional darts player Dave Chisnall uses this version for his walk on in PDC European Tour Events.

2005 unplugged version

"Hier kommt Alex" was also released as a single from the 2005 unplugged album Nur zu Besuch: Unplugged im Wiener Burgtheater. The song is introduced with the first bars of the second movement of Beethoven's Symphony No. 9.

Music video
The video contains live footage.

Track listing
 "Hier kommt Alex" (Meurer/Frege) − 4:08
 "Was zählt" (What counts) (Breitkopf, von Holst/Frege) − 4:04
 "You'll Never Walk Alone" (Rodgers/Hammerstein) − 2:45

Charts

References 

Songs about fictional male characters
1988 singles
2005 singles
Die Toten Hosen songs
Songs written by Campino (singer)
Songs written by Andreas von Holst
Music based on novels
1988 songs